George Espeut (8 December 1917 – 28 December 1991) was a Jamaican weightlifter. He competed in the men's lightweight event at the 1948 Summer Olympics.

References

1917 births
1991 deaths
Jamaican male weightlifters
Olympic weightlifters of Jamaica
Weightlifters at the 1948 Summer Olympics
Sportspeople from Kingston, Jamaica
World Weightlifting Championships medalists